Ergatettix is an Asian genus of ground-hoppers (Orthoptera: Caelifera) in the subfamily Tetriginae (no tribe assigned).

Species 
The Catalogue of Life lists:
Ergatettix albostriatus Zheng & Li, 2001
Ergatettix brachynota Zheng & Liang, 1993
Ergatettix brachyptera Zheng, 1992
Ergatettix callosus Hancock, 1915
Ergatettix crassipes Hancock, 1912
Ergatettix dorsifera Walker, 1871 - type species (as E. tarsalis (Kirby, 1914))
Ergatettix elevatus Ingrisch, 2001
Ergatettix guentheri Steinmann, 1970
Ergatettix interruptus Brunner von Wattenwyl, 1893
Ergatettix lativertex Zheng & Xu, 2010
Ergatettix minutus Ingrisch, 2001
Ergatettix nodulosus Bolívar, 1887
Ergatettix novaeguineae Bolívar, 1898
Ergatettix panchtharis Ingrisch, 2001
Ergatettix paranodulosus Otte, 1997
Ergatettix serrifemora Deng, Zheng & Wei, 2008
Ergatettix serrifemoroides Zheng & Shi, 2009
Ergatettix siasovi Moritz, 1928
Ergatettix undunotus Ingrisch, 2001

References

External links 
 

Tetrigidae
Caelifera genera
Orthoptera of Asia